René-Lévesque is a provincial electoral district in the Côte-Nord region of Quebec, Canada, which elects members to the National Assembly of Quebec. It notably includes the municipalities of Baie-Comeau, Forestville and Pointe-Lebel as well as the reserve of Pessamit.

It was created for the 1948 election under the name Saguenay from part of the former Charlevoix-Saguenay electoral district. The predecessor to Charlevoix-Saguenay (before 1912) was Chicoutimi-Saguenay. Despite its former name, the district has not included the Saguenay–Lac-Saint-Jean region since at least the 1994 election.

It was renamed René-Lévesque for the 2003 election, after former Quebec Premier René Lévesque, although its territory was unchanged. It remained unchanged after the change from the 2001 to the 2011 electoral map.

Members of the National Assembly

Election results

René-Lévesque, 2001 - present

By-election required due to the resignation of Marjolain Dufour, for health reasons.

* Result compared to Action démocratique

Saguenay, 1945 - 2001

References

External links
Information
 Elections Quebec

Election results
 Election results (National Assembly)
 Election results (QuébecPolitique)

Maps
 2011 map (PDF)
 2001 map (Flash)
2001–2011 changes (Flash)
1992–2001 changes to Saguenay (Flash)
 Electoral map of Côte-Nord region
 Quebec electoral map, 2011 

Quebec provincial electoral districts
Baie-Comeau
René Lévesque